The year 1963 involved some significant events in television. Below are lists of notable TV-related events.

Events
January 1 – Osamu Tezuka's Tetsuwan Atomu (Astro Boy), Japan's first serialized animated series based on the popular manga, is broadcast for the first time, on the Japanese television station Fuji Television.
January 13 – BBC Television broadcasts the play Madhouse on Castle Street in the Sunday-Night Theatre series. The play co-stars a young American folk music singer named Bob Dylan.
April 1 – German terrestrial channel ZDF (pronounced tseht-day-ehf) begins broadcasting.
 April 15 - Three months after the first test broadcast, Television Singapura Channel 5 (now Mediacorp Channel 5) signs on as Singapore's first TV station.
May 15 – First television pictures transmitted from a US manned space capsule ("Faith 7").  Due to the poor picture quality, only NBC carries the transmission, and on tape-delay, not live.
July 22 – Bob Crane quits his DJ job at radio station KNX to become a regular on The Donna Reed Show after dividing time between the Screen Gems TV show and the CBS Radio affiliate. Crane had been a top five morning drive radio DJ since the mid-1950s in the Los Angeles market.
September 2 – CBS Evening News becomes network television's first half-hour weeknight news broadcast, when the show is lengthened from 15 to 30 minutes.
September 9 – One week later, NBC also expands its evening network news program, The Huntley-Brinkley Report, to 30 minutes.
September 27 – The Littlest Hobo makes its debut on TV across North America with the first episode entitled "Blue Water Sailor".
September 29 – The Judy Garland Show makes its debut on CBS, which sadly later got cancelled in 1964 after one season (due to competition with the ever popular NBC western Bonanza airing in the same time slot).
September 30 – BBC Television begins using a globe as its symbol. They will continue to use it in varying forms until 2002.
October 1 – ABC News at last drops its dependence on outside sources of news film and begins to rely on its own camera crews.
November 22 – All three major U.S. networks start pre-emptions for a week following the news of the assassination of John F. Kennedy. The pre-emptions unofficially begin a few minutes after President Kennedy is shot: on the top-rated American soap opera As the World Turns, Nancy Hughes (Helen Wagner) is in the middle of a discussion with Grandpa (Santos Ortega) about Bob's (Don Hastings) decision to invite Lisa (Eileen Fulton) to Thanksgiving dinner when Walter Cronkite interrupts Wagner mid-speech to deliver the bulletin. As the World Turns continues for one more scene (at this time, the show is transmitted live) before Cronkite cuts in permanently. News of the assassination, and later the funeral procession, are the first television broadcasts across the Pacific Ocean (via Relay 1 satellite).
November 23 – On BBC Television in the United Kingdom:
William Hartnell stars as the First Doctor in the very first episode of science fiction series Doctor Who (first of the 4-part serial An Unearthly Child). So many people complain of having missed it (because of the disruption to schedules caused by the assassination of John F. Kennedy) that the following Saturday episode 1 is repeated before the broadcast of episode 2. Doctor Who runs until 1989 and is revived from 2005.
That Was the Week That Was broadcasts a serious Kennedy tribute episode. 
November 24 – Jack Ruby murders John F. Kennedy's suspected assassin Lee Harvey Oswald live on television.
November 28 - CBS' Huntsville television station WHNT begins on the air.
December 7 – Instant Replay is used for the first time during the live transmission of the Army Navy Game by its inventor, director, Tony Verna.
December 28 – The launch of television broadcasting service in Malaysia, TV Malaysia, as predecessor of RTM TV1,  member of Radio Televisyen Malaysia in Kuala Lumpur, presided by government leaders from studios in Ampang Road in the capital. 
For the first time, most Americans say that they get more of their news from television than newspapers.
The television remote control is authorized by the FCC.

Programs/programmes
ABC's Wide World of Sports (1961–98)
American Bandstand (1952–89)
Armchair Theatre (1956–68)
As the World Turns (1956–2010)
Ben Casey (1961–66)
Blue Peter (UK) (1958–present)
Bonanza (1959–73)
Bozo the Clown (1949–present)
Candid Camera (1948–2004)
Captain Kangaroo (1955–1984)
Combat! (1962–67)
Come Dancing (UK) (1949–95)
Coronation Street, UK (1960–present)
Death Valley Days (1952–75)
Dixon of Dock Green (UK) (1955–76)
Doctor Who, UK (1963–89, 1996, 2005–present)
Face the Nation (1954–present)
Four Corners, Australia (1961–present)
Grandstand (UK) (1958–2007)
Gunsmoke (1955–75)
Hallmark Hall of Fame (1951–present)
Have Gun Will Travel (1957–63)
Hockey Night in Canada (1952–present)
It's Academic (1961–present)
Juke Box Jury (1959–67, 1979, 1989–90)
Lassie (1954–74)
Love of Life (1951–80)
Mack & Myer for Hire (1963–64)
Match Game (1962–1969, 1973–84, 1990–91, 1998–99, 2016–present)
Meet the Press (1947–present)
Mister Ed (1961–66)
My Three Sons (1960–72)
Opportunity Knocks (UK) (1956–78)
Panorama (UK) (1953–present)
Petticoat Junction, (1963–70)
Professional Bowlers Tour (1962–97)
Search for Tomorrow (1951–86)
The Adventures of Ozzie and Harriet (1952–66)
The Amos 'n Andy Show (1951–53)
The Andy Griffith Show (1960–68)
The Avengers, UK (1961–69)
The Bell Telephone Hour (1959–68)
The Beverly Hillbillies (1962–71)
The Danny Kaye Show (1963-1967)
The Dick Van Dyke Show (1961–66)
The Donna Reed Show (1958–66)
The Ed Sullivan Show (1948–71)
The Edge of Night (1956–84)
The Flintstones (1960–66)
The Fulton Sheen Program (1961–1968)
The Good Old Days (UK) (1953–83)
The Greatest Show on Earth (1963–64)
The Guiding Light (1952–2009)
The Jack Benny Program (1950–65)
The Jetsons (1962–63, 1984–85, 1987)
The Judy Garland Show (1963–64)
The Late Late Show, Ireland (1962–present)
The Lawrence Welk Show (1955–82)
The Lucy Show (1962–68)
The Mike Douglas Show (1961–81)
The Milton Berle Show (1954–67)
The Patty Duke Show, (1963–66)
The Price Is Right (1956–65)
The Saint, UK (1962–69)
The Secret Storm (1954–74)
The Sky at Night (UK) (1957–present)
The Today Show (1952–present)
The Tonight Show Starring Johnny Carson (1962–1992)
The Tonight Show (Steve Allen, 1954–57; Jack Paar, 1957–62)
The Twilight Zone (1959–64)
The World Tonight, Philippines (1962–present)
This Is Your Life (UK) (1955–2003)
Truth or Consequences (1950–88)
Twelve O'Clock High (1964–67)
Walt Disney's Wonderful World of Color (1961–69)
What the Papers Say (UK) (1956–2008)
What's My Line (1950–67)
Z-Cars, UK (1962–78)
Zoo Quest (UK) (1954–1964)

Debuts
January 1 – Astro Boy (known as Mighty Atom in Japanese), on Fuji TV
January 6 – Mutual of Omaha's Wild Kingdom on NBC (1963–88, 2002–2011)
January 7 – World in Action, investigative current affairs series, on Granada Television (UK) (1963–98)
January 14 – 
April 1 – General Hospital (created by Frank and Doris Hursley) and The Doctors ABC (1963–) and NBC (1963–82) respectively
August 9 – Ready Steady Go! on ITV (1963–66)
September 16 – The Outer Limits on ABC (1963–65)
September 17 – The Fugitive on ABC (1963–67)
September 18 – The Patty Duke Show on ABC (1963–66)
September 20 – Burke's Law on ABC (1963–65)
September 24
The Littlest Hobo in Canada (1963–65; 1979–85)
Petticoat Junction on CBS (1963–70)
September 25 - The Danny Kaye Show on CBS (1963–1967)
September 28 - The New Phil Silvers Show (1963–64) and Tennessee Tuxedo and His Tales on CBS (1963–66)
September 29 – The Judy Garland Show (1963–64) and My Favorite Martian (1963–66), both on CBS
October 5 – Le Manège enchanté on la Première chaîne de la RTF (1963–1971, 1989)
October 7 – Hafenpolizei on Deutsches Fernsehen (1963–66)
October 20 – Ritorna il tenente Sheridan on Programma Nazionale
October 27 – Memorandum van een dokter (1963–65) 
November 23 – Doctor Who on BBC Television (1963–89, 1996, 2005–); with William Hartnell as the Doctor (1963–66)
December 1 – Den tänkande brevbäraren on SVT
December 30 – Let's Make a Deal on NBC (1963-1977,  1980–81, 1984–1986, 1990–1991, 2003, 2009–present)
Mack & Myer for Hire this year in syndication (1963–64)

Ending this year

Births

Deaths

Television Debuts
Alun Armstrong – Compact
Ian McShane – First Night
Jerry Orbach – The Doctors and the Nurses
Jon Voight – Naked City
Lesley Ann Warren – The Doctors
Jacki Weaver – Hansel and Gretel

See also
 1963–64 United States network television schedule

References